This article serves as an index – as complete as possible – of all the honorific orders or similar decorations awarded by Thailand, classified by Monarchies chapter and Republics chapter, and, under each chapter, recipients' countries and the detailed list of recipients.

Awards

Thai Royal Family 

 King Maha Vajiralongkorn:
  Sovereign Grand Master of the Most Auspicious Order of the Rajamitrabhorn
  Sovereign Grand Master of the Most Illustrious Order of the Royal House of Chakri
  Sovereign Grand Master of the Ancient and Auspicious Order of the Nine Gems
  Sovereign Grand Master of the Most Illustrious Order of Chula Chom Klao
  Sovereign Grand Master of the Honourable Order of Rama
  Sovereign Grand Master of the Most Exalted Order of the White Elephant
  Sovereign Grand Master of the Most Noble Order of the Crown of Thailand
  Sovereign Grand Master of the Most Admirable Order of the Direkgunabhorn
  Sovereign Grand Master of the Order of Symbolic Propitiousness Ramkeerati 
  Sovereign of the Bravery Medal
  Sovereign of the Freeman Safeguarding Medal
  Sovereign of the Civil Dushdi Mala Medal
  Sovereign of the Border Service Medal
  Sovereign of the Chakra Mala Medal
  Recipient of the King Rama IX Royal Cypher Medal (First Class)
  Recipient of the King Rama IX Court Medal (Gold Class)
  Recipient of the 25th Buddhist Century Celebration Medal
  Recipient of the Commemorative Medal of the Royal State Visits to the United States and Europe of King Rama IX and Queen Sirikit
  Recipient of the King Rama IX Silver Jubilee Medal
  Recipient of the Rattanakosin Bicentennial Medal
  Recipient of the Queen Sirikit 50th Birthday Medal
  Recipient of the Princess Srinagarindra 7th Cycle Birthday Medal
  Recipient of the King Rama IX 5th Cycle Birthday Medal
  Recipient of the King Rama IX Longest Reign Celebrations Medal
  Recipient of the Queen Sirikit 5th Cycle Birthday Medal
  Recipient of the King Rama IX Golden Jubilee Medal
  Recipient of the King Rama IX 6th Cycle Birthday Medal
  Recipient of the Queen Sirikit 6th Cycle Birthday Medal
  Recipient of the King Rama IX 60th Accession to the Throne Celebrations Medal
  Recipient of the King Rama IX 7th Cycle Birthday Medal
  Recipient of the Queen Sirikit 7th Cycle Birthday Medal
 Queen Suthida:
  Dame of the Most Illustrious Order of the Royal House of Chakri
  Dame of the Ancient and Auspicious Order of the Nine Gems
  Dame Grand Cross (First Class) of the Most Illustrious Order of Chula Chom Klao
  Dame Grand Cordon (Special Class) of the Most Exalted Order of the White Elephant
  Dame Grand Cordon (Special Class) of the Most Noble Order of the Crown of Thailand
  Member of the Order of Symbolic Propitiousness Ramkeerati
  Recipient of the King Rama IX Royal Cypher Medal (First Class)
  Recipient of the King Rama X Royal Cypher Medal (First Class)
  Recipient of the King Rama IX 7th Cycle Birthday Medal
  Recipient of the Crown Prince Maha Vajiralongkorn 5th Cycle Birthday Medal
  Recipient of the Princess Maha Chakri Sirindhon 5th Cycle Birthday Medal
  Recipient of the Queen Sirikit 7th Cycle Birthday Medal
  Recipient of the King Rama X Coronation Medal
 Queen Mother Sirikit:
  Dame of the Most Illustrious Order of the Royal House of Chakri, with diamond star
  Dame of the Ancient and Auspicious Order of the Nine Gems, with diamond star
  Dame Grand Cross (First Class) of the Most Illustrious Order of Chula Chom Klao, with diamond star
  Dame Grand Cordon (Special Class) of the Most Exalted Order of the White Elephant
  Dame Grand Cordon (Special Class) of the Most Noble Order of the Crown of Thailand
  Dame Grand Cross (First Class) of the Most Admirable Order of the Direkgunabhorn
  Member of the Order of Symbolic Propitiousness Ramkeerati
  Recipient of the Freeman Safeguarding Medal (First Class)
  Recipient of the Civil Dushdi Mala Medal
  Recipient of the Border Service Medal
  Recipient of the King Rama IX Royal Cypher Medal (First Class)
  Recipient of the King Rama X Royal Cypher Medal (First Class)
  Recipient of the King Rama IX Court Medal (Gold Class)
  Recipient of the King Rama IX Coronation Medal
  Recipient of the 25th Buddhist Century Celebration Medal
  Recipient of the King Rama IX Silver Jubilee Medal
  Recipient of the Rattanakosin Bicentennial Medal
  Recipient of the King Rama IX 5th Cycle Birthday Medal
  Recipient of the King Rama IX Longest Reign Celebrations Medal
  Recipient of the King Rama IX Golden Jubilee Medal
  Recipient of the King Rama IX 6th Cycle Birthday Medal
  Recipient of the King Rama IX 60th Accession to the Throne Celebrations Medal
  Recipient of the King Rama IX 7th Cycle Birthday Medal
  Recipient of the King Rama X Coronation Medal
  Sovereign of the Red Cross Medal of Merit
 Princess Maha Chakri Sirindhorn, the Princess Royal:
  Dame of The Most Illustrious Order of the Royal House of Chakri
  Dame of The Ancient and Auspicious Order of the Nine Gems
  Dame Grand Cross (First Class) of The Most Illustrious Order of Chula Chom Klao
  Dame Grand Cordon (Special Class) of The Most Exalted Order of the White Elephant
  Dame Grand Cordon (Special Class) of The Most Noble Order of the Crown of Thailand
  Dame Grand Cross (First Class) of the Most Admirable Order of the Direkgunabhorn
  Member of the Order of Symbolic Propitiousness Ramkeerati
  Recipient of the Freeman Safeguarding Medal (First Class)
  Recipient of the Civil Dushdi Mala Medal
  Recipient of the Border Service Medal
  Recipient of the Chakra Mala Medal
  Recipient of the Boy Scout Citation Medal of Vajira (First Class)
  Recipient of the King Rama IX Royal Cypher Medal (First Class)
  Recipient of the King Rama X Royal Cypher Medal (First Class)
  Recipient of the King Rama IX Court Medal (Gold Class)
  Recipient of the 25th Buddhist Century Celebration Medal
  Recipient of the Commemorative Medal of the Royal State Visits to the United States and Europe of King Rama IX and Queen Sirikit
  Recipient of the King Rama IX Silver Jubilee Medal
  Recipient of the Crown Prince Maha Vajiralongkorn Investiture Medal
  Recipient of the Rattanakosin Bicentennial Medal
  Recipient of the Queen Sirikit 50th Birthday Medal
  Recipient of the Princess Srinagarindra 7th Cycle Birthday Medal
  Recipient of the King Rama IX 5th Cycle Birthday Medal
  Recipient of the King Rama IX Longest Reign Celebrations Medal
  Recipient of the Queen Sirikit 5th Cycle Birthday Medal
  Recipient of the King Rama IX Golden Jubilee Medal
  Recipient of the King Rama IX 6th Cycle Birthday Medal
  Recipient of the Queen Sirikit 6th Cycle Birthday Medal
  Recipient of the King Rama IX 60th Accession to the Throne Celebrations Medal
  Recipient of the King Rama IX 7th Cycle Birthday Medal
  Recipient of the Crown Prince Maha Vajiralongkorn 5th Cycle Birthday Medal
  Recipient of the Queen Sirikit 7th Cycle Birthday Medal
  Recipient of the King Rama X Coronation Medal
  Recipient of the Queen Suthida Investiture Medal
  Recipient of the Queen Sirikit 90th Birthday Medal
  Recipient of the Red Cross Medal of Appreciation (First Class)
 Princess Bajrakitiyabha, the Princess Rajasarini Siribajra:
  Dame of the Most Illustrious Order of the Royal House of Chakri
  Dame of the Ancient and Auspicious Order of the Nine Gems
  Dame Grand Cross (First Class) of the Most Illustrious Order of Chula Chom Klao
  Dame Grand Cordon (Special Class) of the Most Exalted Order of the White Elephant
  Dame Grand Cordon (Special Class) of the Most Noble Order of the Crown of Thailand
  Dame Grand Cross (First Class) of the Most Admirable Order of the Direkgunabhorn
  Member of the Order of Symbolic Propitiousness Ramkeerati
  Recipient of the King Rama IX Royal Cypher Medal (First Class)
  Recipient of the King Rama X Royal Cypher Medal (First Class)
  Recipient of the Rattanakosin Bicentennial Medal
  Recipient of the Queen Sirikit 50th Birthday Medal
  Recipient of the Princess Srinagarindra 7th Cycle Birthday Medal
  Recipient of the King Rama IX 5th Cycle Birthday Medal
  Recipient of the King Rama IX Longest Reign Celebrations Medal
  Recipient of the Queen Sirikit 5th Cycle Birthday Medal
  Recipient of the King Rama IX Golden Jubilee Medal
  Recipient of the King Rama IX 6th Cycle Birthday Medal
  Recipient of the Queen Sirikit 6th Cycle Birthday Medal
  Recipient of the King Rama IX 60th Accession to the Throne Celebrations Medal
  Recipient of the King Rama IX 7th Cycle Birthday Medal
  Recipient of the Crown Prince Maha Vajiralongkorn 5th Cycle Birthday Medal
  Recipient of the Princess Maha Chakri Sirindhon 5th Cycle Birthday Medal
  Recipient of the Queen Sirikit 7th Cycle Birthday Medal
  Recipient of the King Rama X Coronation Medal
  Recipient of the Queen Suthida Investiture Medal
  Recipient of the Queen Sirikit 90th Birthday Medal
 Princess Sirivannavari Nariratana:
  Dame of the Most Illustrious Order of the Royal House of Chakri
  Dame Grand Cross (First Class) of the Most Illustrious Order of Chula Chom Klao
  Dame Grand Cordon (Special Class) of the Most Exalted Order of the White Elephant
  Dame Grand Cordon (Special Class) of the Most Noble Order of the Crown of Thailand
  Dame Grand Cross (First Class) of the Most Admirable Order of the Direkgunabhorn
  Recipient of the King Rama IX Royal Cypher Medal (First Class)
  Recipient of the King Rama X Royal Cypher Medal (First Class)
  Recipient of the King Rama IX 5th Cycle Birthday Medal
  Recipient of the King Rama IX Longest Reign Celebrations Medal
  Recipient of the Queen Sirikit 5th Cycle Birthday Medal
  Recipient of the King Rama IX Golden Jubilee Medal
  Recipient of the King Rama IX 6th Cycle Birthday Medal
  Recipient of the Queen Sirikit 6th Cycle Birthday Medal
  Recipient of the King Rama IX 60th Accession to the Throne Celebrations Medal
  Recipient of the King Rama IX 7th Cycle Birthday Medal
  Recipient of the Crown Prince Maha Vajiralongkorn 5th Cycle Birthday Medal
  Recipient of the Princess Maha Chakri Sirindhon 5th Cycle Birthday Medal
  Recipient of the Queen Sirikit 7th Cycle Birthday Medal
  Recipient of the King Rama X Coronation Medal
  Recipient of the Queen Suthida Investiture Medal
  Recipient of the Queen Sirikit 90th Birthday Medal
 Prince Dipangkorn Rasmijoti:
  Knight of The Most Illustrious Order of the Royal House of Chakri
  Recipient of the King Rama IX Royal Cypher Medal (First Class)
  Recipient of the King Rama X Royal Cypher Medal (First Class)
  Recipient of the King Rama IX 60th Accession to the Throne Celebrations Medal
  Recipient of the King Rama IX 7th Cycle Birthday Medal
  Recipient of the Crown Prince Maha Vajiralongkorn 5th Cycle Birthday Medal
  Recipient of the Princess Maha Chakri Sirindhon 5th Cycle Birthday Medal
  Recipient of the Queen Sirikit 7th Cycle Birthday Medal
  Recipient of the King Rama X Coronation Medal
  Recipient of the Queen Suthida Investiture Medal
  Recipient of the Queen Sirikit 90th Birthday Medal
 Princess Ubolratana Rajakanya:
  Dame of the Most Illustrious Order of the Royal House of Chakri
  Dame Grand Cross (First Class) of the Most Illustrious Order of Chula Chom Klao
  Dame Grand Cordon of the Most Exalted Order of the White Elephant
  Dame Grand Cordon (Special Class) of the Most Noble Order of the Crown of Thailand
  Recipient of the Boy Scout Citation Medal of Vajira (First Class)
  Recipient of the King Rama IX Royal Cypher Medal (First Class)
  Recipient of the King Rama X Royal Cypher Medal (First Class)
  Recipient of the 25th Buddhist Century Celebration Medal
  Recipient of the Commemorative Medal of the Royal State Visits to the United States and Europe of King Rama IX and Queen Sirikit
  Recipient of the King Rama IX Silver Jubilee Medal
  Recipient of the Crown Prince Maha Vajiralongkorn Investiture Medal
  Recipient of the Princess Maha Chakri Sirindhon Elevation Medal
  Recipient of the Rattanakosin Bicentennial Medal
  Recipient of the Queen Sirikit 50th Birthday Medal
  Recipient of the Princess Srinagarindra 7th Cycle Birthday Medal
  Recipient of the King Rama IX 5th Cycle Birthday Medal
  Recipient of the King Rama IX Longest Reign Celebrations Medal
  Recipient of the Queen Sirikit 5th Cycle Birthday Medal
  Recipient of the King Rama IX Golden Jubilee Medal
  Recipient of the King Rama IX 6th Cycle Birthday Medal
  Recipient of the Queen Sirikit 6th Cycle Birthday Medal
  Recipient of the King Rama IX 60th Accession to the Throne Celebrations Medal
  Recipient of the King Rama IX 7th Cycle Birthday Medal
  Recipient of the Crown Prince Maha Vajiralongkorn 5th Cycle Birthday Medal
  Recipient of the Princess Maha Chakri Sirindhon 5th Cycle Birthday Medal
  Recipient of the Queen Sirikit 7th Cycle Birthday Medal
  Recipient of the King Rama X Coronation Medal
  Recipient of the Queen Suthida Investiture Medal
  Recipient of the Queen Sirikit 90th Birthday Medal
 Princess Chulabhorn Walailak, the Princess Srisavangavadhana:
  Dame of the Most Illustrious Order of the Royal House of Chakri
  Dame of the Ancient and Auspicious Order of the Nine Gems
  Dame Grand Cross (First Class) of the Most Illustrious Order of Chula Chom Klao
  Dame Grand Cordon (Special Class) of the Most Exalted Order of the White Elephant
  Dame Grand Cordon (Special Class) of the Most Noble Order of the Crown of Thailand
  Dame Grand Cross (First Class) of the Most Admirable Order of the Direkgunabhorn
  Member of the Order of Symbolic Propitiousness Ramkeerati
  Recipient of the Freeman Safeguarding Medal (First Class)
  Recipient of the Border Service Medal
  Recipient of the Chakrabarti Mala Medal
  Recipient of the King Rama IX Royal Cypher Medal (First Class)
  Recipient of the King Rama X Royal Cypher Medal (First Class)
  Recipient of the Commemorative Medal of the Royal State Visits to the United States and Europe of King Rama IX and Queen Sirikit
  Recipient of the King Rama IX Silver Jubilee Medal
  Recipient of the Crown Prince Maha Vajiralongkorn Investiture Medal
  Recipient of the Princess Maha Chakri Sirindhon Elevation Medal
  Recipient of the Rattanakosin Bicentennial Medal
  Recipient of the Queen Sirikit 50th Birthday Medal
  Recipient of the Princess Srinagarindra 7th Cycle Birthday Medal
  Recipient of the King Rama IX 5th Cycle Birthday Medal
  Recipient of the King Rama IX Longest Reign Celebrations Medal
  Recipient of the Queen Sirikit 5th Cycle Birthday Medal
  Recipient of the King Rama IX Golden Jubilee Medal
  Recipient of the King Rama IX 6th Cycle Birthday Medal
  Recipient of the Queen Sirikit 6th Cycle Birthday Medal
  Recipient of the King Rama IX 60th Accession to the Throne Celebrations Medal
  Recipient of the King Rama IX 7th Cycle Birthday Medal
  Recipient of the Crown Prince Maha Vajiralongkorn 5th Cycle Birthday Medal
  Recipient of the Princess Maha Chakri Sirindhon 5th Cycle Birthday Medal
  Recipient of the Queen Sirikit 7th Cycle Birthday Medal
  Recipient of the King Rama X Coronation Medal
  Recipient of the Queen Suthida Investiture Medal
  Recipient of the Queen Sirikit 90th Birthday Medal
  Recipient of the Red Cross Medal of Appreciation (First Class)
 Princess Siribha Chudabhorn:
  Dame Grand Cross (First Class) of the Most Illustrious Order of Chula Chom Klao
  Dame Grand Cordon (Special Class) of the Most Exalted Order of the White Elephant
  Dame Grand Cordon (Special Class) of the Most Noble Order of the Crown of Thailand
  Recipient of the King Rama IX Royal Cypher Medal (First Class)
  Recipient of the King Rama X Royal Cypher Medal (First Class)
  Recipient of the Princess Srinagarindra 7th Cycle Birthday Medal
  Recipient of the King Rama IX 5th Cycle Birthday Medal
  Recipient of the King Rama IX Longest Reign Celebrations Medal
  Recipient of the Queen Sirikit 5th Cycle Birthday Medal
  Recipient of the King Rama IX Golden Jubilee Medal
  Recipient of the King Rama IX 6th Cycle Birthday Medal
  Recipient of the Queen Sirikit 6th Cycle Birthday Medal
  Recipient of the King Rama IX 60th Accession to the Throne Celebrations Medal
  Recipient of the King Rama IX 7th Cycle Birthday Medal
  Recipient of the Crown Prince Maha Vajiralongkorn 5th Cycle Birthday Medal
  Recipient of the Princess Maha Chakri Sirindhon 5th Cycle Birthday Medal
  Recipient of the Queen Sirikit 7th Cycle Birthday Medal
  Recipient of the King Rama X Coronation Medal
  Recipient of the Queen Suthida Investiture Medal
  Recipient of the Queen Sirikit 90th Birthday Medal
 Princess Aditayadorn Kitikhun:
  Dame Grand Cross (First Class) of the Most Illustrious Order of Chula Chom Klao
  Dame Grand Cordon (Special Class) of the Most Exalted Order of the White Elephant
  Dame Grand Cordon (Special Class) of the Most Noble Order of the Crown of Thailand
  Recipient of the King Rama X Royal Cypher Medal (First Class)
  Recipient of the Princess Srinagarindra 7th Cycle Birthday Medal
  Recipient of the King Rama IX 5th Cycle Birthday Medal
  Recipient of the King Rama IX Longest Reign Celebrations Medal
  Recipient of the Queen Sirikit 5th Cycle Birthday Medal
  Recipient of the King Rama IX Golden Jubilee Medal
  Recipient of the King Rama IX 6th Cycle Birthday Medal
  Recipient of the Queen Sirikit 6th Cycle Birthday Medal
  Recipient of the King Rama IX 60th Accession to the Throne Celebrations Medal
  Recipient of the King Rama IX 7th Cycle Birthday Medal
  Recipient of the Crown Prince Maha Vajiralongkorn 5th Cycle Birthday Medal
  Recipient of the Princess Maha Chakri Sirindhon 5th Cycle Birthday Medal
  Recipient of the Queen Sirikit 7th Cycle Birthday Medal
  Recipient of the King Rama X Coronation Medal
  Recipient of the Queen Suthida Investiture Medal
  Recipient of the Queen Sirikit 90th Birthday Medal
 Princess Soamsawali, the Princess Suddhanarinatha:
  Dame of the Most Illustrious Order of the Royal House of Chakri
  Dame of the Ancient and Auspicious Order of the Nine Gems
  Dame Grand Cross (First Class) of the Most Illustrious Order of Chula Chom Klao
  Dame Grand Cordon (Special Class) of the Most Exalted Order of the White Elephant
  Dame Grand Cordon (Special Class) of the Most Noble Order of the Crown of Thailand
  Dame Grand Cross (First Class) of the Most Admirable Order of the Direkgunabhorn
  Member of the Order of Symbolic Propitiousness Ramkeerati
  Recipient of the King Rama IX Royal Cypher Medal (First Class)
  Recipient of the King Rama X Royal Cypher Medal (First Class)
  Recipient of the Commemorative Medal of the Royal State Visits to the United States and Europe of King Rama IX and Queen Sirikit
  Recipient of the King Rama IX Silver Jubilee Medal
  Recipient of the Crown Prince Maha Vajiralongkorn Investiture Medal
  Recipient of the Princess Maha Chakri Sirindhon Elevation Medal
  Recipient of the Rattanakosin Bicentennial Medal
  Recipient of the Queen Sirikit 50th Birthday Medal
  Recipient of the Princess Srinagarindra 7th Cycle Birthday Medal
  Recipient of the King Rama IX 5th Cycle Birthday Medal
  Recipient of the King Rama IX Longest Reign Celebrations Medal
  Recipient of the Queen Sirikit 5th Cycle Birthday Medal
  Recipient of the King Rama IX Golden Jubilee Medal
  Recipient of the King Rama IX 6th Cycle Birthday Medal
  Recipient of the Queen Sirikit 6th Cycle Birthday Medal
  Recipient of the King Rama IX 60th Accession to the Throne Celebrations Medal
  Recipient of the King Rama IX 7th Cycle Birthday Medal
  Recipient of the Crown Prince Maha Vajiralongkorn 5th Cycle Birthday Medal
  Recipient of the Princess Maha Chakri Sirindhon 5th Cycle Birthday Medal
  Recipient of the Queen Sirikit 7th Cycle Birthday Medal
  Recipient of the King Rama X Coronation Medal
  Recipient of the Queen Suthida Investiture Medal
  Recipient of the Queen Sirikit 90th Birthday Medal

Other Members 

 Juthavachara Vivacharawongse (Vajiralongkorn's son):
  Recipient of the Rattanakosin Bicentennial Medal
  Recipient of the Queen Sirikit 50th Birthday Medal
  Recipient of the Princess Srinagarindra 7th Cycle Birthday Medal
  Recipient of the King Rama IX 5th Cycle Birthday Medal
  Recipient of the King Rama IX Longest Reign Celebrations Medal
  Recipient of the Queen Sirikit 5th Cycle Birthday Medal
  Recipient of the King Rama IX Golden Jubilee Medal
 Vacharaesorn Vivacharawongse (Vajiralongkorn's son):
  Recipient of the Rattanakosin Bicentennial Medal
  Recipient of the Queen Sirikit 50th Birthday Medal
  Recipient of the Princess Srinagarindra 7th Cycle Birthday Medal
  Recipient of the King Rama IX 5th Cycle Birthday Medal
  Recipient of the King Rama IX Longest Reign Celebrations Medal
  Recipient of the Queen Sirikit 5th Cycle Birthday Medal
  Recipient of the King Rama IX Golden Jubilee Medal
 Chakriwat Vivacharawongse (Vajiralongkorn's son):
  Recipient of the Princess Srinagarindra 7th Cycle Birthday Medal
  Recipient of the King Rama IX 5th Cycle Birthday Medal
  Recipient of the King Rama IX Longest Reign Celebrations Medal
  Recipient of the Queen Sirikit 5th Cycle Birthday Medal
  Recipient of the King Rama IX Golden Jubilee Medal
 Vatchrawee Vivacharawongse (Vajiralongkorn's son):
  Recipient of the King Rama IX 5th Cycle Birthday Medal
  Recipient of the King Rama IX Longest Reign Celebrations Medal
  Recipient of the Queen Sirikit 5th Cycle Birthday Medal
  Recipient of the King Rama IX Golden Jubilee Medal
 Chao Khun Phra Sineenat (Vajiralongkorn's concubine):
  Dame Grand Cross (First Class) of the Most Illustrious Order of Chula Chom Klao
  Dame Grand Cordon (Special Class) of the Most Exalted Order of the White Elephant
  Dame Grand Cordon (Special Class) of the Most Noble Order of the Crown of Thailand
  Recipient of the King Rama X Royal Cypher Medal (First Class)
  Recipient of the King Rama IX 7th Cycle Birthday Medal
  Recipient of the Crown Prince Maha Vajiralongkorn 5th Cycle Birthday Medal
  Recipient of the Princess Maha Chakri Sirindhon 5th Cycle Birthday Medal
  Recipient of the Queen Sirikit 7th Cycle Birthday Medal
  Recipient of the King Rama X Coronation Medal
  Recipient of the Queen Suthida Investiture Medal
  Recipient of the Queen Sirikit 90th Birthday Medal
 Than Phu Ying Ploypailin Jensen (Ubolratana's daughter):
  Dame Grand Cordon (Special Class) of the Most Noble Order of the Crown of Thailand
  Dame Grand Commander (Second Class, Upper Grade) of the Most Illustrious Order of Chula Chom Klao
  Recipient of the King Rama IX Royal Cypher Medal (First Class)
  Recipient of the King Rama X Royal Cypher Medal (First Class)
  Recipient of the Rattanakosin Bicentennial Medal
  Recipient of the Queen Sirikit 50th Birthday Medal
  Recipient of the Princess Srinagarindra 7th Cycle Birthday Medal
  Recipient of the King Rama IX 5th Cycle Birthday Medal
  Recipient of the King Rama IX Longest Reign Celebrations Medal
  Recipient of the Queen Sirikit 5th Cycle Birthday Medal
  Recipient of the King Rama IX Golden Jubilee Medal
  Recipient of the King Rama IX 6th Cycle Birthday Medal
  Recipient of the Queen Sirikit 6th Cycle Birthday Medal
  Recipient of the King Rama IX 60th Accession to the Throne Celebrations Medal
  Recipient of the King Rama IX 7th Cycle Birthday Medal
  Recipient of the Crown Prince Maha Vajiralongkorn 5th Cycle Birthday Medal
  Recipient of the Princess Maha Chakri Sirindhon 5th Cycle Birthday Medal
  Recipient of the Queen Sirikit 7th Cycle Birthday Medal
  Recipient of the King Rama X Coronation Medal
  Recipient of the Queen Suthida Investiture Medal
  Recipient of the Queen Sirikit 90th Birthday Medal
 Than Phu Ying Sirikitiya Jensen (Ubolratana's daughter):
  Dame Grand Cordon (Special Class) of the Most Noble Order of the Crown of Thailand
  Dame Grand Commander (Second Class, Upper Grade) of the Most Illustrious Order of Chula Chom Klao
  Recipient of the King Rama IX Royal Cypher Medal (First Class)
  Recipient of the King Rama X Royal Cypher Medal (First Class)
  Recipient of the King Rama IX 5th Cycle Birthday Medal
  Recipient of the King Rama IX Longest Reign Celebrations Medal
  Recipient of the Queen Sirikit 5th Cycle Birthday Medal
  Recipient of the King Rama IX Golden Jubilee Medal
  Recipient of the King Rama IX 6th Cycle Birthday Medal
  Recipient of the Queen Sirikit 6th Cycle Birthday Medal
  Recipient of the King Rama IX 60th Accession to the Throne Celebrations Medal
  Recipient of the King Rama IX 7th Cycle Birthday Medal
  Recipient of the Crown Prince Maha Vajiralongkorn 5th Cycle Birthday Medal
  Recipient of the Princess Maha Chakri Sirindhon 5th Cycle Birthday Medal
  Recipient of the Queen Sirikit 7th Cycle Birthday Medal
  Recipient of the King Rama X Coronation Medal
  Recipient of the Queen Suthida Investiture Medal
  Recipient of the Queen Sirikit 90th Birthday Medal
 Than Phu Ying Dhasanawalaya Sornsongkram (Vajiralongkorn's cousin):
  Dame Grand Cordon (Special Class) of the Most Exalted Order of the White Elephant
  Dame Grand Cordon (Special Class) of the Most Noble Order of the Crown of Thailand
  Dame Grand Commander (Second Class, Upper Grade) of the Most Illustrious Order of Chula Chom Klao
  Dame Grand Cross (First Class) of the Most Admirable Order of the Direkgunabhorn
  Recipient of the King Rama IX Royal Cypher Medal (First Class)
  Recipient of the King Rama X Royal Cypher Medal (First Class)
  Recipient of the King Rama IX Coronation Medal
  Recipient of the 25th Buddhist Century Celebration Medal
  Recipient of the Commemorative Medal of the Royal State Visits to the United States and Europe of King Rama IX and Queen Sirikit
  Recipient of the King Rama IX Silver Jubilee Medal
  Recipient of the Crown Prince Maha Vajiralongkorn Investiture Medal
  Recipient of the Princess Maha Chakri Sirindhon Elevation Medal
  Recipient of the Rattanakosin Bicentennial Medal
  Recipient of the Queen Sirikit 50th Birthday Medal
  Recipient of the Princess Srinagarindra 7th Cycle Birthday Medal
  Recipient of the King Rama IX 5th Cycle Birthday Medal
  Recipient of the King Rama IX Longest Reign Celebrations Medal
  Recipient of the Queen Sirikit 5th Cycle Birthday Medal
  Recipient of the King Rama IX Golden Jubilee Medal
  Recipient of the King Rama IX 6th Cycle Birthday Medal
  Recipient of the Queen Sirikit 6th Cycle Birthday Medal
  Recipient of the King Rama IX 60th Accession to the Throne Celebrations Medal
  Recipient of the King Rama IX 7th Cycle Birthday Medal
  Recipient of the Crown Prince Maha Vajiralongkorn 5th Cycle Birthday Medal
  Recipient of the Princess Maha Chakri Sirindhon 5th Cycle Birthday Medal
  Recipient of the Queen Sirikit 7th Cycle Birthday Medal
  Recipient of the King Rama X Coronation Medal
  Recipient of the Queen Suthida Investiture Medal
  Recipient of the Queen Sirikit 90th Birthday Medal
 Jitat Sornsongkram (Dhasanawalaya's son):
  Knight Grand Cordon (Special Class) of the Most Noble Order of the Crown of Thailand
  Grand Companion (Third Class, Upper Grade) of the Most Illustrious Order of Chula Chom Klao
  Recipient of the Princess Maha Chakri Sirindhon Elevation Medal
  Recipient of the Rattanakosin Bicentennial Medal
  Recipient of the Queen Sirikit 50th Birthday Medal
  Recipient of the Princess Srinagarindra 7th Cycle Birthday Medal
  Recipient of the King Rama IX 5th Cycle Birthday Medal
  Recipient of the King Rama IX Longest Reign Celebrations Medal
  Recipient of the Queen Sirikit 5th Cycle Birthday Medal
  Recipient of the King Rama IX Golden Jubilee Medal
  Recipient of the King Rama IX 6th Cycle Birthday Medal
  Recipient of the Queen Sirikit 6th Cycle Birthday Medal
  Recipient of the King Rama IX 60th Accession to the Throne Celebrations Medal
  Recipient of the King Rama IX 7th Cycle Birthday Medal
  Recipient of the Crown Prince Maha Vajiralongkorn 5th Cycle Birthday Medal
  Recipient of the Princess Maha Chakri Sirindhon 5th Cycle Birthday Medal
  Recipient of the Queen Sirikit 7th Cycle Birthday Medal
  Recipient of the King Rama X Coronation Medal
  Recipient of the Queen Suthida Investiture Medal
  Recipient of the Queen Sirikit 90th Birthday Medal

Former Members 

 Than Phu Ying Srirasmi Suwadee (Vajiralongkorn's third wife):
  Dame Grand Cross (First Class) of the Most Illustrious Order of Chula Chom Klao
  Dame Grand Cordon (Special Class) of the Most Exalted Order of the White Elephant
  Dame Grand Cordon (Special Class) of the Most Noble Order of the Crown of Thailand
  Recipient of the King Rama IX Royal Cypher Medal (First Class)
  Recipient of the King Rama IX Golden Jubilee Medal
  Recipient of the King Rama IX 6th Cycle Birthday Medal
  Recipient of the Queen Sirikit 6th Cycle Birthday Medal
  Recipient of the King Rama IX 60th Accession to the Throne Celebrations Medal
  Recipient of the King Rama IX 7th Cycle Birthday Medal
  Recipient of the Crown Prince Maha Vajiralongkorn 5th Cycle Birthday Medal
  Recipient of the Princess Maha Chakri Sirindhon 5th Cycle Birthday Medal
  Recipient of the Queen Sirikit 7th Cycle Birthday Medal
  Recipient of the King Rama X Coronation Medal
  Recipient of the Queen Suthida Investiture Medal
  Recipient of the Queen Sirikit 90th Birthday Medal

Cadet houses Royal Members 

 Bhanubandhu

 Princess Uthaikanya Bhanubandhu:
  Dame Commander (Second Class) of the Most Exalted Order of the White Elephant
  Dame Commander (Second Class) of the Most Noble Order of the Crown of Thailand
  Recipient of the Chakrabarti Mala Medal
  Recipient of the King Rama IX Coronation Medal
  Recipient of the 25th Buddhist Century Celebration Medal
  Recipient of the Commemorative Medal of the Royal State Visits to the United States and Europe of King Rama IX and Queen Sirikit
  Recipient of the King Rama IX Silver Jubilee Medal
  Recipient of the Crown Prince Maha Vajiralongkorn Investiture Medal
  Recipient of the Princess Maha Chakri Sirindhon Elevation Medal
  Recipient of the Rattanakosin Bicentennial Medal
  Recipient of the Queen Sirikit 50th Birthday Medal
  Recipient of the Princess Srinagarindra 7th Cycle Birthday Medal
  Recipient of the King Rama IX 5th Cycle Birthday Medal
  Recipient of the King Rama IX Longest Reign Celebrations Medal
  Recipient of the Queen Sirikit 5th Cycle Birthday Medal
  Recipient of the King Rama IX Golden Jubilee Medal
  Recipient of the King Rama IX 6th Cycle Birthday Medal
  Recipient of the Queen Sirikit 6th Cycle Birthday Medal
  Recipient of the King Rama IX 60th Accession to the Throne Celebrations Medal
  Recipient of the King Rama IX 7th Cycle Birthday Medal
  Recipient of the Crown Prince Maha Vajiralongkorn 5th Cycle Birthday Medal
  Recipient of the Princess Maha Chakri Sirindhon 5th Cycle Birthday Medal
  Recipient of the Queen Sirikit 7th Cycle Birthday Medal
  Recipient of the King Rama X Coronation Medal
  Recipient of the Queen Suthida Investiture Medal
  Recipient of the Queen Sirikit 90th Birthday Medal
 Phanwarophat Svetarundra (Former Princess):
  Recipient of the King Rama IX Coronation Medal
  Recipient of the 25th Buddhist Century Celebration Medal
  Recipient of the Commemorative Medal of the Royal State Visits to the United States and Europe of King Rama IX and Queen Sirikit
  Recipient of the King Rama IX Silver Jubilee Medal
  Recipient of the Crown Prince Maha Vajiralongkorn Investiture Medal
  Recipient of the Princess Maha Chakri Sirindhon Elevation Medal
  Recipient of the Rattanakosin Bicentennial Medal
  Recipient of the Queen Sirikit 50th Birthday Medal
  Recipient of the Princess Srinagarindra 7th Cycle Birthday Medal
  Recipient of the King Rama IX 5th Cycle Birthday Medal
  Recipient of the King Rama IX Longest Reign Celebrations Medal
  Recipient of the Queen Sirikit 5th Cycle Birthday Medal
  Recipient of the King Rama IX Golden Jubilee Medal
  Recipient of the King Rama IX 6th Cycle Birthday Medal
  Recipient of the Queen Sirikit 6th Cycle Birthday Medal
  Recipient of the King Rama IX 60th Accession to the Throne Celebrations Medal
  Recipient of the King Rama IX 7th Cycle Birthday Medal
  Recipient of the Crown Prince Maha Vajiralongkorn 5th Cycle Birthday Medal
  Recipient of the Princess Maha Chakri Sirindhon 5th Cycle Birthday Medal
  Recipient of the Queen Sirikit 7th Cycle Birthday Medal
  Recipient of the King Rama X Coronation Medal
  Recipient of the Queen Suthida Investiture Medal
  Recipient of the Queen Sirikit 90th Birthday Medal

 Jayankura

 Princess Uthaithiang Jayankura:
  Recipient of the Rattanakosin Sesquicentennial Medal
  Recipient of the King Rama IX Coronation Medal
  Recipient of the 25th Buddhist Century Celebration Medal
  Recipient of the Commemorative Medal of the Royal State Visits to the United States and Europe of King Rama IX and Queen Sirikit
  Recipient of the King Rama IX Silver Jubilee Medal
  Recipient of the Crown Prince Maha Vajiralongkorn Investiture Medal
  Recipient of the Princess Maha Chakri Sirindhon Elevation Medal
  Recipient of the Rattanakosin Bicentennial Medal
  Recipient of the Queen Sirikit 50th Birthday Medal
  Recipient of the Princess Srinagarindra 7th Cycle Birthday Medal
  Recipient of the King Rama IX 5th Cycle Birthday Medal
  Recipient of the King Rama IX Longest Reign Celebrations Medal
  Recipient of the Queen Sirikit 5th Cycle Birthday Medal
  Recipient of the King Rama IX Golden Jubilee Medal
  Recipient of the King Rama IX 6th Cycle Birthday Medal
  Recipient of the Queen Sirikit 6th Cycle Birthday Medal
  Recipient of the King Rama IX 60th Accession to the Throne Celebrations Medal
  Recipient of the King Rama IX 7th Cycle Birthday Medal
  Recipient of the Crown Prince Maha Vajiralongkorn 5th Cycle Birthday Medal
  Recipient of the Princess Maha Chakri Sirindhon 5th Cycle Birthday Medal
  Recipient of the Queen Sirikit 7th Cycle Birthday Medal
  Recipient of the King Rama X Coronation Medal
  Recipient of the Queen Suthida Investiture Medal
  Recipient of the Queen Sirikit 90th Birthday Medal

 Prince Charunritdet Jayankura:
  Recipient of the King Rama IX Coronation Medal
  Recipient of the 25th Buddhist Century Celebration Medal
  Recipient of the Commemorative Medal of the Royal State Visits to the United States and Europe of King Rama IX and Queen Sirikit
  Recipient of the King Rama IX Silver Jubilee Medal
  Recipient of the Crown Prince Maha Vajiralongkorn Investiture Medal
  Recipient of the Princess Maha Chakri Sirindhon Elevation Medal
  Recipient of the Rattanakosin Bicentennial Medal
  Recipient of the Queen Sirikit 50th Birthday Medal
  Recipient of the Princess Srinagarindra 7th Cycle Birthday Medal
  Recipient of the King Rama IX 5th Cycle Birthday Medal
  Recipient of the King Rama IX Longest Reign Celebrations Medal
  Recipient of the Queen Sirikit 5th Cycle Birthday Medal
  Recipient of the King Rama IX Golden Jubilee Medal
  Recipient of the King Rama IX 6th Cycle Birthday Medal
  Recipient of the Queen Sirikit 6th Cycle Birthday Medal
  Recipient of the King Rama IX 60th Accession to the Throne Celebrations Medal
  Recipient of the King Rama IX 7th Cycle Birthday Medal
  Recipient of the Crown Prince Maha Vajiralongkorn 5th Cycle Birthday Medal
  Recipient of the Princess Maha Chakri Sirindhon 5th Cycle Birthday Medal
  Recipient of the Queen Sirikit 7th Cycle Birthday Medal
  Recipient of the King Rama X Coronation Medal
  Recipient of the Queen Suthida Investiture Medal
  Recipient of the Queen Sirikit 90th Birthday Medal

 Svastivatana

 Prince Pusan Svastivatana:
  Knight Grand Cross (First Class) of the Most Illustrious Order of Chula Chom Klao
  Knight Grand Cordon (Special Class) of the Most Exalted Order of the White Elephant
  Knight Grand Cordon (Special Class) of the Most Noble Order of the Crown of Thailand
  Recipient of the Victory Medal - Vietnam War, with flames
  Recipient of the Chakra Mala Medal
  Recipient of the King Rama X Royal Cypher Medal (Second Class)
  Recipient of the Rattanakosin Sesquicentennial Medal
  Recipient of the King Rama IX Coronation Medal
  Recipient of the 25th Buddhist Century Celebration Medal
  Recipient of the Commemorative Medal of the Royal State Visits to the United States and Europe of King Rama IX and Queen Sirikit
  Recipient of the King Rama IX Silver Jubilee Medal
  Recipient of the Crown Prince Maha Vajiralongkorn Investiture Medal
  Recipient of the Princess Maha Chakri Sirindhon Elevation Medal
  Recipient of the Rattanakosin Bicentennial Medal
  Recipient of the Queen Sirikit 50th Birthday Medal
  Recipient of the Princess Srinagarindra 7th Cycle Birthday Medal
  Recipient of the King Rama IX 5th Cycle Birthday Medal
  Recipient of the King Rama IX Longest Reign Celebrations Medal
  Recipient of the Queen Sirikit 5th Cycle Birthday Medal
  Recipient of the King Rama IX Golden Jubilee Medal
  Recipient of the King Rama IX 6th Cycle Birthday Medal
  Recipient of the Queen Sirikit 6th Cycle Birthday Medal
  Recipient of the King Rama IX 60th Accession to the Throne Celebrations Medal
  Recipient of the King Rama IX 7th Cycle Birthday Medal
  Recipient of the Crown Prince Maha Vajiralongkorn 5th Cycle Birthday Medal
  Recipient of the Princess Maha Chakri Sirindhon 5th Cycle Birthday Medal
  Recipient of the Queen Sirikit 7th Cycle Birthday Medal
  Recipient of the King Rama X Coronation Medal
  Recipient of the Queen Suthida Investiture Medal
  Recipient of the Queen Sirikit 90th Birthday Medal

 Paribatra

 Induratana Paribatra (Former Princess):
  Recipient of the King Rama VII Coronation Medal
  Recipient of the Rattanakosin Sesquicentennial Medal
  Recipient of the King Rama IX Coronation Medal
  Recipient of the 25th Buddhist Century Celebration Medal
  Recipient of the Commemorative Medal of the Royal State Visits to the United States and Europe of King Rama IX and Queen Sirikit
  Recipient of the King Rama IX Silver Jubilee Medal
  Recipient of the Crown Prince Maha Vajiralongkorn Investiture Medal
  Recipient of the Princess Maha Chakri Sirindhon Elevation Medal
  Recipient of the Rattanakosin Bicentennial Medal
  Recipient of the Queen Sirikit 50th Birthday Medal
  Recipient of the Princess Srinagarindra 7th Cycle Birthday Medal
  Recipient of the King Rama IX 5th Cycle Birthday Medal
  Recipient of the King Rama IX Longest Reign Celebrations Medal
  Recipient of the Queen Sirikit 5th Cycle Birthday Medal
  Recipient of the King Rama IX Golden Jubilee Medal
  Recipient of the King Rama IX 6th Cycle Birthday Medal
  Recipient of the Queen Sirikit 6th Cycle Birthday Medal
  Recipient of the King Rama IX 60th Accession to the Throne Celebrations Medal
  Recipient of the King Rama IX 7th Cycle Birthday Medal
  Recipient of the Crown Prince Maha Vajiralongkorn 5th Cycle Birthday Medal
  Recipient of the Princess Maha Chakri Sirindhon 5th Cycle Birthday Medal
  Recipient of the Queen Sirikit 7th Cycle Birthday Medal
  Recipient of the King Rama X Coronation Medal
  Recipient of the Queen Suthida Investiture Medal
  Recipient of the Queen Sirikit 90th Birthday Medal

 Yugala

 Prince Nawaphan Yugala:
  Knight Grand Cross (First Class) of the Most Noble Order of the Crown of Thailand
  Recipient of the Rattanakosin Bicentennial Medal
  Recipient of the Queen Sirikit 50th Birthday Medal
  Recipient of the Princess Srinagarindra 7th Cycle Birthday Medal
  Recipient of the King Rama IX 5th Cycle Birthday Medal
  Recipient of the King Rama IX Longest Reign Celebrations Medal
  Recipient of the Queen Sirikit 5th Cycle Birthday Medal
  Recipient of the King Rama IX Golden Jubilee Medal
  Recipient of the King Rama IX 6th Cycle Birthday Medal
  Recipient of the Queen Sirikit 6th Cycle Birthday Medal
  Recipient of the King Rama IX 60th Accession to the Throne Celebrations Medal
  Recipient of the King Rama IX 7th Cycle Birthday Medal
  Recipient of the Crown Prince Maha Vajiralongkorn 5th Cycle Birthday Medal
  Recipient of the Princess Maha Chakri Sirindhon 5th Cycle Birthday Medal
  Recipient of the Queen Sirikit 7th Cycle Birthday Medal
  Recipient of the King Rama X Coronation Medal
  Recipient of the Queen Suthida Investiture Medal
  Recipient of the Queen Sirikit 90th Birthday Medal
 Prince Mongkhonchaloem Yugala:
  Knight Grand Cordon (Special Class) of the Most Exalted Order of the White Elephant
  Knight Grand Cordon (Special Class) of the Most Noble Order of the Crown of Thailand
  Knight Grand Commander (Second Class, Upper Grade) of the Most Illustrious Order of Chula Chom Klao
  Recipient of the King Rama X Royal Cypher Medal (Third Class)
  Recipient of the King Rama IX Coronation Medal
  Recipient of the 25th Buddhist Century Celebration Medal
  Recipient of the Commemorative Medal of the Royal State Visits to the United States and Europe of King Rama IX and Queen Sirikit
  Recipient of the King Rama IX Silver Jubilee Medal
  Recipient of the Crown Prince Maha Vajiralongkorn Investiture Medal
  Recipient of the Princess Maha Chakri Sirindhon Elevation Medal
  Recipient of the Rattanakosin Bicentennial Medal
  Recipient of the Queen Sirikit 50th Birthday Medal
  Recipient of the Princess Srinagarindra 7th Cycle Birthday Medal
  Recipient of the King Rama IX 5th Cycle Birthday Medal
  Recipient of the King Rama IX Longest Reign Celebrations Medal
  Recipient of the Queen Sirikit 5th Cycle Birthday Medal
  Recipient of the King Rama IX Golden Jubilee Medal
  Recipient of the King Rama IX 6th Cycle Birthday Medal
  Recipient of the Queen Sirikit 6th Cycle Birthday Medal
  Recipient of the King Rama IX 60th Accession to the Throne Celebrations Medal
  Recipient of the King Rama IX 7th Cycle Birthday Medal
  Recipient of the Crown Prince Maha Vajiralongkorn 5th Cycle Birthday Medal
  Recipient of the Princess Maha Chakri Sirindhon 5th Cycle Birthday Medal
  Recipient of the Queen Sirikit 7th Cycle Birthday Medal
  Recipient of the King Rama X Coronation Medal
  Recipient of the Queen Suthida Investiture Medal
  Recipient of the Queen Sirikit 90th Birthday Medal
 Prince Chaloemsuek Yugala:
  Knight Grand Cordon (Special Class) of the Most Exalted Order of the White Elephant
  Knight Grand Cordon (Special Class) of the Most Noble Order of the Crown of Thailand
  Knight Grand Commander (Second Class, Upper Grade) of the Most Illustrious Order of Chula Chom Klao
  Member of Silver Medal (Seventh Class) of the Most Admirable Order of the Direkgunabhorn
  Recipient of the Chakra Mala Medal
  Recipient of the King Rama X Royal Cypher Medal (Third Class)
  Recipient of the 25th Buddhist Century Celebration Medal
  Recipient of the Commemorative Medal of the Royal State Visits to the United States and Europe of King Rama IX and Queen Sirikit
  Recipient of the King Rama IX Silver Jubilee Medal
  Recipient of the Crown Prince Maha Vajiralongkorn Investiture Medal
  Recipient of the Princess Maha Chakri Sirindhon Elevation Medal
  Recipient of the Rattanakosin Bicentennial Medal
  Recipient of the Queen Sirikit 50th Birthday Medal
  Recipient of the Princess Srinagarindra 7th Cycle Birthday Medal
  Recipient of the King Rama IX 5th Cycle Birthday Medal
  Recipient of the King Rama IX Longest Reign Celebrations Medal
  Recipient of the Queen Sirikit 5th Cycle Birthday Medal
  Recipient of the King Rama IX Golden Jubilee Medal
  Recipient of the King Rama IX 6th Cycle Birthday Medal
  Recipient of the Queen Sirikit 6th Cycle Birthday Medal
  Recipient of the King Rama IX 60th Accession to the Throne Celebrations Medal
  Recipient of the King Rama IX 7th Cycle Birthday Medal
  Recipient of the Crown Prince Maha Vajiralongkorn 5th Cycle Birthday Medal
  Recipient of the Princess Maha Chakri Sirindhon 5th Cycle Birthday Medal
  Recipient of the Queen Sirikit 7th Cycle Birthday Medal
  Recipient of the King Rama X Coronation Medal
  Recipient of the Queen Suthida Investiture Medal
  Recipient of the Queen Sirikit 90th Birthday Medal
  Recipient of the Red Cross Medal of Appreciation (Second Class)
 Prince Thikhamphon Yugala:
  Knight Grand Cordon (Special Class) of the Most Exalted Order of the White Elephant
  Knight Grand Cordon (Special Class) of the Most Noble Order of the Crown of Thailand
  Knight Commander (Second Class, Lower Grade) of the Most Illustrious Order of Chula Chom Klao
  Recipient of the King Rama X Royal Cypher Medal (Third Class)
  Recipient of the 25th Buddhist Century Celebration Medal
  Recipient of the Commemorative Medal of the Royal State Visits to the United States and Europe of King Rama IX and Queen Sirikit
  Recipient of the King Rama IX Silver Jubilee Medal
  Recipient of the Crown Prince Maha Vajiralongkorn Investiture Medal
  Recipient of the Princess Maha Chakri Sirindhon Elevation Medal
  Recipient of the Rattanakosin Bicentennial Medal
  Recipient of the Queen Sirikit 50th Birthday Medal
  Recipient of the Princess Srinagarindra 7th Cycle Birthday Medal
  Recipient of the King Rama IX 5th Cycle Birthday Medal
  Recipient of the King Rama IX Longest Reign Celebrations Medal
  Recipient of the Queen Sirikit 5th Cycle Birthday Medal
  Recipient of the King Rama IX Golden Jubilee Medal
  Recipient of the King Rama IX 6th Cycle Birthday Medal
  Recipient of the Queen Sirikit 6th Cycle Birthday Medal
  Recipient of the King Rama IX 60th Accession to the Throne Celebrations Medal
  Recipient of the King Rama IX 7th Cycle Birthday Medal
  Recipient of the Crown Prince Maha Vajiralongkorn 5th Cycle Birthday Medal
  Recipient of the Princess Maha Chakri Sirindhon 5th Cycle Birthday Medal
  Recipient of the Queen Sirikit 7th Cycle Birthday Medal
  Recipient of the King Rama X Coronation Medal
  Recipient of the Queen Suthida Investiture Medal
  Recipient of the Queen Sirikit 90th Birthday Medal
 Prince Chatrichalerm Yugala:
  Knight Grand Cordon (Special Class) of the Most Exalted Order of the White Elephant
  Knight Grand Cordon (Special Class) of the Most Noble Order of the Crown of Thailand
  Grand Companion (Third Class, Upper Grade) of the Most Illustrious Order of Chula Chom Klao
  Companion (Fourth Class) of the Most Admirable Order of the Direkgunabhorn
  Recipient of the King Rama IX Royal Cypher Medal (Fourth Class)
  Recipient of the King Rama IX Coronation Medal
  Recipient of the 25th Buddhist Century Celebration Medal
  Recipient of the Commemorative Medal of the Royal State Visits to the United States and Europe of King Rama IX and Queen Sirikit
  Recipient of the King Rama IX Silver Jubilee Medal
  Recipient of the Crown Prince Maha Vajiralongkorn Investiture Medal
  Recipient of the Princess Maha Chakri Sirindhon Elevation Medal
  Recipient of the Rattanakosin Bicentennial Medal
  Recipient of the Queen Sirikit 50th Birthday Medal
  Recipient of the Princess Srinagarindra 7th Cycle Birthday Medal
  Recipient of the King Rama IX 5th Cycle Birthday Medal
  Recipient of the King Rama IX Longest Reign Celebrations Medal
  Recipient of the Queen Sirikit 5th Cycle Birthday Medal
  Recipient of the King Rama IX Golden Jubilee Medal
  Recipient of the King Rama IX 6th Cycle Birthday Medal
  Recipient of the Queen Sirikit 6th Cycle Birthday Medal
  Recipient of the King Rama IX 60th Accession to the Throne Celebrations Medal
  Recipient of the King Rama IX 7th Cycle Birthday Medal
  Recipient of the Crown Prince Maha Vajiralongkorn 5th Cycle Birthday Medal
  Recipient of the Princess Maha Chakri Sirindhon 5th Cycle Birthday Medal
  Recipient of the Queen Sirikit 7th Cycle Birthday Medal
  Recipient of the King Rama X Coronation Medal
  Recipient of the Queen Suthida Investiture Medal
  Recipient of the Queen Sirikit 90th Birthday Medal
 Prince Chulcherm Yugala:
  Knight Grand Cordon (Special Class) of the Most Exalted Order of the White Elephant
  Knight Grand Cordon (Special Class) of the Most Noble Order of the Crown of Thailand
  Knight Grand Commander (Second Class, Upper Grade) of the Most Illustrious Order of Chula Chom Klao
  Recipient of the Freeman Safeguarding Medal (Second Class)
  Recipient of the King Rama X Royal Cypher Medal (Third Class)
  Recipient of the 25th Buddhist Century Celebration Medal
  Recipient of the Commemorative Medal of the Royal State Visits to the United States and Europe of King Rama IX and Queen Sirikit
  Recipient of the King Rama IX Silver Jubilee Medal
  Recipient of the Crown Prince Maha Vajiralongkorn Investiture Medal
  Recipient of the Princess Maha Chakri Sirindhon Elevation Medal
  Recipient of the Rattanakosin Bicentennial Medal
  Recipient of the Queen Sirikit 50th Birthday Medal
  Recipient of the Princess Srinagarindra 7th Cycle Birthday Medal
  Recipient of the King Rama IX 5th Cycle Birthday Medal
  Recipient of the King Rama IX Longest Reign Celebrations Medal
  Recipient of the Queen Sirikit 5th Cycle Birthday Medal
  Recipient of the King Rama IX Golden Jubilee Medal
  Recipient of the King Rama IX 6th Cycle Birthday Medal
  Recipient of the Queen Sirikit 6th Cycle Birthday Medal
  Recipient of the King Rama IX 60th Accession to the Throne Celebrations Medal
  Recipient of the King Rama IX 7th Cycle Birthday Medal
  Recipient of the Crown Prince Maha Vajiralongkorn 5th Cycle Birthday Medal
  Recipient of the Princess Maha Chakri Sirindhon 5th Cycle Birthday Medal
  Recipient of the Queen Sirikit 7th Cycle Birthday Medal
  Recipient of the King Rama X Coronation Medal
  Recipient of the Queen Suthida Investiture Medal
  Recipient of the Queen Sirikit 90th Birthday Medal
 Princess Nopphadonchaloemsri Yugala:
  Recipient of the 25th Buddhist Century Celebration Medal
  Recipient of the Commemorative Medal of the Royal State Visits to the United States and Europe of King Rama IX and Queen Sirikit
  Recipient of the King Rama IX Silver Jubilee Medal
  Recipient of the Crown Prince Maha Vajiralongkorn Investiture Medal
  Recipient of the Princess Maha Chakri Sirindhon Elevation Medal
  Recipient of the Rattanakosin Bicentennial Medal
  Recipient of the Queen Sirikit 50th Birthday Medal
  Recipient of the Princess Srinagarindra 7th Cycle Birthday Medal
  Recipient of the King Rama IX 5th Cycle Birthday Medal
  Recipient of the King Rama IX Longest Reign Celebrations Medal
  Recipient of the Queen Sirikit 5th Cycle Birthday Medal
  Recipient of the King Rama IX Golden Jubilee Medal
  Recipient of the King Rama IX 6th Cycle Birthday Medal
  Recipient of the Queen Sirikit 6th Cycle Birthday Medal
  Recipient of the King Rama IX 60th Accession to the Throne Celebrations Medal
  Recipient of the King Rama IX 7th Cycle Birthday Medal
  Recipient of the Crown Prince Maha Vajiralongkorn 5th Cycle Birthday Medal
  Recipient of the Princess Maha Chakri Sirindhon 5th Cycle Birthday Medal
  Recipient of the Queen Sirikit 7th Cycle Birthday Medal
  Recipient of the King Rama X Coronation Medal
  Recipient of the Queen Suthida Investiture Medal
  Recipient of the Queen Sirikit 90th Birthday Medal
 Than Phu Ying Phansawali Kitiyakara (Former Princess):
  Dame Grand Cordon (Special Class) of the Most Exalted Order of the White Elephant
  Dame Grand Cordon (Special Class) of the Most Noble Order of the Crown of Thailand
  Dame Grand Commander (Second Class, Upper Grade) of the Most Illustrious Order of Chula Chom Klao
  Recipient of the King Rama IX Coronation Medal
  Recipient of the 25th Buddhist Century Celebration Medal
  Recipient of the Commemorative Medal of the Royal State Visits to the United States and Europe of King Rama IX and Queen Sirikit
  Recipient of the King Rama IX Silver Jubilee Medal
  Recipient of the Crown Prince Maha Vajiralongkorn Investiture Medal
  Recipient of the Princess Maha Chakri Sirindhon Elevation Medal
  Recipient of the Rattanakosin Bicentennial Medal
  Recipient of the Queen Sirikit 50th Birthday Medal
  Recipient of the Princess Srinagarindra 7th Cycle Birthday Medal
  Recipient of the King Rama IX 5th Cycle Birthday Medal
  Recipient of the King Rama IX Longest Reign Celebrations Medal
  Recipient of the Queen Sirikit 5th Cycle Birthday Medal
  Recipient of the King Rama IX Golden Jubilee Medal
  Recipient of the King Rama IX 6th Cycle Birthday Medal
  Recipient of the Queen Sirikit 6th Cycle Birthday Medal
  Recipient of the King Rama IX 60th Accession to the Throne Celebrations Medal
  Recipient of the King Rama IX 7th Cycle Birthday Medal
  Recipient of the Crown Prince Maha Vajiralongkorn 5th Cycle Birthday Medal
  Recipient of the Princess Maha Chakri Sirindhon 5th Cycle Birthday Medal
  Recipient of the Queen Sirikit 7th Cycle Birthday Medal
  Recipient of the King Rama X Coronation Medal
  Recipient of the Queen Suthida Investiture Medal
  Recipient of the Queen Sirikit 90th Birthday Medal
 Phanuma Yugala (Former Princess):
  Recipient of the Rattanakosin Bicentennial Medal
  Recipient of the Queen Sirikit 50th Birthday Medal
  Recipient of the Princess Srinagarindra 7th Cycle Birthday Medal
  Recipient of the King Rama IX 5th Cycle Birthday Medal
  Recipient of the King Rama IX Longest Reign Celebrations Medal
  Recipient of the Queen Sirikit 5th Cycle Birthday Medal
  Recipient of the King Rama IX Golden Jubilee Medal
  Recipient of the King Rama IX 6th Cycle Birthday Medal
  Recipient of the Queen Sirikit 6th Cycle Birthday Medal
  Recipient of the King Rama IX 60th Accession to the Throne Celebrations Medal
  Recipient of the King Rama IX 7th Cycle Birthday Medal
  Recipient of the Crown Prince Maha Vajiralongkorn 5th Cycle Birthday Medal
  Recipient of the Princess Maha Chakri Sirindhon 5th Cycle Birthday Medal
  Recipient of the Queen Sirikit 7th Cycle Birthday Medal
  Recipient of the King Rama X Coronation Medal
  Recipient of the Queen Suthida Investiture Medal
  Recipient of the Queen Sirikit 90th Birthday Medal
 Sisawangwong Bunyachittradun (Former Princess):
  Dame Grand Cross (First Class) of the Most Noble Order of the Crown of Thailand
  Recipient of the King Rama IX Coronation Medal
  Recipient of the 25th Buddhist Century Celebration Medal
  Recipient of the Commemorative Medal of the Royal State Visits to the United States and Europe of King Rama IX and Queen Sirikit
  Recipient of the King Rama IX Silver Jubilee Medal
  Recipient of the Crown Prince Maha Vajiralongkorn Investiture Medal
  Recipient of the Princess Maha Chakri Sirindhon Elevation Medal
  Recipient of the Rattanakosin Bicentennial Medal
  Recipient of the Queen Sirikit 50th Birthday Medal
  Recipient of the Princess Srinagarindra 7th Cycle Birthday Medal
  Recipient of the King Rama IX 5th Cycle Birthday Medal
  Recipient of the King Rama IX Longest Reign Celebrations Medal
  Recipient of the Queen Sirikit 5th Cycle Birthday Medal
  Recipient of the King Rama IX Golden Jubilee Medal
  Recipient of the King Rama IX 6th Cycle Birthday Medal
  Recipient of the Queen Sirikit 6th Cycle Birthday Medal
  Recipient of the King Rama IX 60th Accession to the Throne Celebrations Medal
  Recipient of the King Rama IX 7th Cycle Birthday Medal
  Recipient of the Crown Prince Maha Vajiralongkorn 5th Cycle Birthday Medal
  Recipient of the Princess Maha Chakri Sirindhon 5th Cycle Birthday Medal
  Recipient of the Queen Sirikit 7th Cycle Birthday Medal
  Recipient of the King Rama X Coronation Medal
  Recipient of the Queen Suthida Investiture Medal
  Recipient of the Queen Sirikit 90th Birthday Medal
 Phummariphirom Shell (Former Princess):
  Recipient of the King Rama IX Coronation Medal
  Recipient of the 25th Buddhist Century Celebration Medal
  Recipient of the Commemorative Medal of the Royal State Visits to the United States and Europe of King Rama IX and Queen Sirikit
  Recipient of the King Rama IX Silver Jubilee Medal
  Recipient of the Crown Prince Maha Vajiralongkorn Investiture Medal
  Recipient of the Princess Maha Chakri Sirindhon Elevation Medal
  Recipient of the Rattanakosin Bicentennial Medal
  Recipient of the Queen Sirikit 50th Birthday Medal
  Recipient of the Princess Srinagarindra 7th Cycle Birthday Medal
  Recipient of the King Rama IX 5th Cycle Birthday Medal
  Recipient of the King Rama IX Longest Reign Celebrations Medal
  Recipient of the Queen Sirikit 5th Cycle Birthday Medal
  Recipient of the King Rama IX Golden Jubilee Medal
  Recipient of the King Rama IX 6th Cycle Birthday Medal
  Recipient of the Queen Sirikit 6th Cycle Birthday Medal
  Recipient of the King Rama IX 60th Accession to the Throne Celebrations Medal
  Recipient of the King Rama IX 7th Cycle Birthday Medal
  Recipient of the Crown Prince Maha Vajiralongkorn 5th Cycle Birthday Medal
  Recipient of the Princess Maha Chakri Sirindhon 5th Cycle Birthday Medal
  Recipient of the Queen Sirikit 7th Cycle Birthday Medal
  Recipient of the King Rama X Coronation Medal
  Recipient of the Queen Suthida Investiture Medal
  Recipient of the Queen Sirikit 90th Birthday Medal
 Patthamanarangsi Senanarong (Former Princess):
  Dame Grand Cross (First Class) of the Most Exalted Order of the White Elephant
  Dame Grand Cross (First Class) of the Most Noble Order of the Crown of Thailand
  Recipient of the King Rama IX Coronation Medal
  Recipient of the 25th Buddhist Century Celebration Medal
  Recipient of the Commemorative Medal of the Royal State Visits to the United States and Europe of King Rama IX and Queen Sirikit
  Recipient of the King Rama IX Silver Jubilee Medal
  Recipient of the Crown Prince Maha Vajiralongkorn Investiture Medal
  Recipient of the Princess Maha Chakri Sirindhon Elevation Medal
  Recipient of the Rattanakosin Bicentennial Medal
  Recipient of the Queen Sirikit 50th Birthday Medal
  Recipient of the Princess Srinagarindra 7th Cycle Birthday Medal
  Recipient of the King Rama IX 5th Cycle Birthday Medal
  Recipient of the King Rama IX Longest Reign Celebrations Medal
  Recipient of the Queen Sirikit 5th Cycle Birthday Medal
  Recipient of the King Rama IX Golden Jubilee Medal
  Recipient of the King Rama IX 6th Cycle Birthday Medal
  Recipient of the Queen Sirikit 6th Cycle Birthday Medal
  Recipient of the King Rama IX 60th Accession to the Throne Celebrations Medal
  Recipient of the King Rama IX 7th Cycle Birthday Medal
  Recipient of the Crown Prince Maha Vajiralongkorn 5th Cycle Birthday Medal
  Recipient of the Princess Maha Chakri Sirindhon 5th Cycle Birthday Medal
  Recipient of the Queen Sirikit 7th Cycle Birthday Medal
  Recipient of the King Rama X Coronation Medal
  Recipient of the Queen Suthida Investiture Medal
  Recipient of the Queen Sirikit 90th Birthday Medal

 Vudhijaya

 Khun Ying Wutchaloem Vudhijaya (Former Princess):
  Dame Commander (Second Class) of the Most Exalted Order of the White Elephant
  Commander (Third Class) of the Most Noble Order of the Crown of Thailand
  Companion (Fourth Class) of the Most Admirable Order of the Direkgunabhorn
  Member (Fourth Class) of the Most Illustrious Order of Chula Chom Klao
  Recipient of the King Rama IX Coronation Medal
  Recipient of the 25th Buddhist Century Celebration Medal
  Recipient of the Commemorative Medal of the Royal State Visits to the United States and Europe of King Rama IX and Queen Sirikit
  Recipient of the King Rama IX Silver Jubilee Medal
  Recipient of the Crown Prince Maha Vajiralongkorn Investiture Medal
  Recipient of the Princess Maha Chakri Sirindhon Elevation Medal
  Recipient of the Rattanakosin Bicentennial Medal
  Recipient of the Queen Sirikit 50th Birthday Medal
  Recipient of the Princess Srinagarindra 7th Cycle Birthday Medal
  Recipient of the King Rama IX 5th Cycle Birthday Medal
  Recipient of the King Rama IX Longest Reign Celebrations Medal
  Recipient of the Queen Sirikit 5th Cycle Birthday Medal
  Recipient of the King Rama IX Golden Jubilee Medal
  Recipient of the King Rama IX 6th Cycle Birthday Medal
  Recipient of the Queen Sirikit 6th Cycle Birthday Medal
  Recipient of the King Rama IX 60th Accession to the Throne Celebrations Medal
  Recipient of the King Rama IX 7th Cycle Birthday Medal
  Recipient of the Crown Prince Maha Vajiralongkorn 5th Cycle Birthday Medal
  Recipient of the Princess Maha Chakri Sirindhon 5th Cycle Birthday Medal
  Recipient of the Queen Sirikit 7th Cycle Birthday Medal
  Recipient of the King Rama X Coronation Medal
  Recipient of the Queen Suthida Investiture Medal
  Recipient of the Queen Sirikit 90th Birthday Medal

Monarchies 
European monarchies

Belgian Royal Family 
 King Philippe of Belgium : Recipient of the King Rama IX 60th Accession to the Throne Celebrations Medal
 Queen Mathilde of Belgium : Recipient of the King Rama IX 60th Accession to the Throne Celebrations Medal

British Royal Family 
 Queen Elizabeth II : Dame of the Order of the Royal House of Chakri
 Prince Andrew, Duke of York : Recipient of the King Rama IX 60th Accession to the Throne Celebrations Medal
 Princess Alexandra, The Honourable Lady Ogilvy : Dame Grand Cross (First Class) of the Order of Chula Chom Klao

Danish Royal Family 

 Queen Margrethe II of Denmark :
 Dame of the Order of the Rajamitrabhorn
 Dame of the Order of the Royal House of Chakri 
 Frederik, Crown Prince of Denmark : Knight Grand Cross of the Order of Chula Chom Klao

Dutch Royal Family 

 King Willem-Alexander of the Netherlands : 
 Knight Grand Cross of the Order of Chula Chom Klao
 Recipient of the King Rama IX 60th Accession to the Throne Celebrations Medal
 Queen Máxima of the Netherlands : Recipient of the King Rama IX 60th Accession to the Throne Celebrations Medal
 Princess Beatrix of the Netherlands :
 Dame of the Order of the Rajamitrabhorn
 Dame of the Order of the Royal House of Chakri
 Princess Irene of the Netherlands : Dame Grand Cross (First Class) of the Order of Chula Chom Klao

Liechtensteiner princely Family 

 Regent Alois, Hereditary Prince of Liechtenstein : Recipient of the King Rama IX 60th Accession to the Throne Celebrations Medal

Luxembourger grand ducal Family 

 Henri, Grand Duke of Luxembourg : Recipient of the King Rama IX 60th Accession to the Throne Celebrations Medal

Monegasque princely Family 

 Albert II, Prince of Monaco : Recipient of the King Rama IX 60th Accession to the Throne Celebrations Medal

Norwegian Royal Family 

 King Harald V of Norway : 
 Knight of the Order of the Royal House of Chakri
 Knight Grand Cordon (First Class) of the Order of Chula Chom Klao
 Crown Prince Haakon of Norway : Recipient of the King Rama IX 60th Accession to the Throne Celebrations Medal
 Crown Princess Mette-Marit of Norway : Recipient of the King Rama IX 60th Accession to the Throne Celebrations Medal
 Princess Astrid, Mrs. Ferner : Dame Grand Cross (First Class) of the Order of Chula Chom Klao

Spanish Royal Family 

 King Felipe VI : Knight Grand Cordon (Special Class) of the Order of the White Elephant
 King Juan Carlos I : 
 Knight of the Order of the Rajamitrabhorn
 Knight of the Order of the Royal House of Chakri
 Queen Sofía of Spain : 
 Dame of the Order of the Royal House of Chakri
 Dame Grand Cross (First Class) of the Order of Chula Chom Klao
 Recipient of the King Rama IX 60th Accession to the Throne Celebrations Medal
 Infanta Cristina of Spain : Dame Grand Cordon (Special Class) of the Order of the White Elephant

Swedish Royal Family   

 King Carl XVI Gustaf of Sweden : 
 Knight of the Order of the Rajamitrabhorn
 Member of the Order of Ramkeerati
 Recipient of the King Rama IX 60th Accession to the Throne Celebrations Medal
 Queen Silvia of Sweden : 
 Dame Grand Cross (First Class) of the Order of Chula Chom Klao
 Recipient of the Boy Scout Citation Medal of Vajira (First Class)
 Recipient of the King Rama IX 60th Accession to the Throne Celebrations Medal

Asian monarchies

Bhutanese Royal Family 

 King Jigme Khesar Namgyel Wangchuck : Recipient of the King Rama IX 60th Accession to the Throne Celebrations Medal

Bruneian Royal Family 

 Sultan Hassanal Bolkiah : 
 Knight of the Order of Rajamitrabhorn 
 Recipient of the King Rama IX 60th Accession to the Throne Celebrations Medal
 Queen Saleha of Brunei : 
 Dame Grand Cross (First Class) of the Order of Chula Chom Klao
 Recipient of the King Rama IX 60th Accession to the Throne Celebrations Medal
 Princess Fadzillah Lubabul Bolkiah : Dame Grand Cordon (Special Class) of the Order of the White Elephant 
 Prince Mohamed Bolkiah : 
 Knight Grand Cordon of the Order of the White Elephant 
 Knight Grand Cordon of the Order of the Crown of Thailand 
 Prince Sufri Bolkiah : Knight Grand Cordon (Special Class) of the Order of the White Elephant
 Prince Jefri Bolkiah : Knight Grand Cordon (Special Class) of the Order of the White Elephant
 Princess Masna Bolkiah : Dame Grand Cordon (Special Class) of the Order of the White Elephant
 Pengiran Anak Haji Abdul Aziz : Knight Grand Cross (First Class) of the Order of the White Elephant

 Former Members
 Hajah Mariam : Dame Grand Cross (First Class) of the Order of Chula Chom Klao
 Mazuin Hamzah : Dame Grand Cross (First Class) of the Order of the White Elephant

Cambodian Royal Family 
 King Norodom Sihamoni : Recipient of the King Rama IX 60th Accession to the Throne Celebrations Medal
 Princess Norodom Arunrasmy : Recipient of the King Rama IX 60th Accession to the Throne Celebrations Medal
 Prince Sisowath Sirirath : Knight Grand Cross (First Class) of the Order of the White Elephant

Emirati Rulers & family

Abu Dhabi Royal Family 
 President Mohamed bin Zayed Al Nahyan : Recipient of the King Rama IX 60th Accession to the Throne Celebrations Medal

Japanese Imperial Family 
 Emperor Akihito: 
 Knight of the Order of the Rajamitrabhorn
 Knight of the Order of the Royal House of Chakri
 Recipient of the King Rama IX 60th Accession to the Throne Celebrations Medal
 Empress Michiko : 
 Dame of the Order of the Royal House of Chakri
 Recipient of the King Rama IX 60th Accession to the Throne Celebrations Medal

Jordanian Royal Family 
 King Abdullah II of Jordan : Recipient of the King Rama IX 60th Accession to the Throne Celebrations Medal

Kuwaiti Royal Family 
 Sheikh Ahmed Al-Fahad Al-Ahmed Al-Sabah : Knight Grand Cross (First Class) of the Order of the Crown of Thailand

Malaysian Yang di-Pertuan Agongs & family

Kedahan Royal Family 
 Che Puan Besar Haminah : Dame Grand Cross (First Class) of the Order of Chula Chom Klao

Perakian Royal Family 
 Raja Permaisuri Tuanku Bainun : Dame Grand Cross (First Class) of the Order of Chula Chom Klao

Perlisian Royal Family 
 Raja Sirajuddin of Perlis : Recipient of the King Rama IX 60th Accession to the Throne Celebrations Medal
 Raja Perempuan Tuanku Tengku Fauziah : Recipient of the King Rama IX 60th Accession to the Throne Celebrations Medal

Selangorean Royal Family 
 Permaisuri Siti Aishah : Dame Grand Cross (First Class) of the Order of Chula Chom Klao

Terengganuan Royal Family 
 Sultan Mizan Zainal Abidin of Terengganu : Knight of the Order of the Rajamitrabhorn
 Sultanah Nur Zahirah : Dame Grand Cross (First Class) of the Order of Chula Chom Klao
 Tengku Mustafa Kamil, the Tengku Sri Bendahara Raja : Knight Grand Cordon (Special Class) of the Order of the White Elephant
 Tengku Badrul Hisham, the Tengku Sri Temenggong Raja : Knight Grand Cordon (Special Class) of the Order of the White Elephant

Omani Royal Family 
 Sayyid Shihab bin Tariq al-Said : Recipient of the King Rama IX 60th Accession to the Throne Celebrations Medal

Qatari Royal Family 
 Sheikh Hamad bin Khalifa Al Thani : Recipient of the King Rama IX 60th Accession to the Throne Celebrations Medal
 Sheikha Moza bint Nasser : Recipient of the King Rama IX 60th Accession to the Throne Celebrations Medal

African monarchies

Emaswati Royal Family 

 King Mswati III : Recipient of the King Rama IX 60th Accession to the Throne Celebrations Medal

Moroccan Royal Family 

 Princess Lalla Salma of Morocco : Recipient of the King Rama IX 60th Accession to the Throne Celebrations Medal

Mosotho Royal Family 

 King Letsie III : Recipient of the King Rama IX 60th Accession to the Throne Celebrations Medal
 Queen 'Masenate Mohato Seeiso : Recipient of the King Rama IX 60th Accession to the Throne Celebrations Medal

Former Monarchies

Greek Royal Family 
 King Constantine II of Greece : Kinght of the Order of the Royal House of Chakri
 Princess Irene of Greece and Denmark : Dame Grand Cross of the Order of Chula Chom Klao

Iranian Imperial Family 
 Empress Farah of Iran : Dame of the Order of the Royal House of Chakri

Nepalese Royal Family 
 Princess Shova Shahi of Nepal : Dame Grand Cordon (Special Class) of the Order of the White Elephant

Republics

President Thongloun Sisoulith : Knight Grand Cross (First Class) of the Order of the White Elephant

SAC Chairman Min Aung Hlaing : 
 Knight Grand Cross (First Class) of the Order of the White Elephant
 Knight Grand Cross (First Class) of the Order of the Crown of Thailand

President Arnoldo Alemán : Knight Grand Cordon (Special Class) of the Order of the White Elephant

President Alberto Fujimori : Knight Grand Cordon (Special Class) of the Order of the White Elephant
 President Alejandro Toledo : Knight Grand Cordon (Special Class) of the Order of the White Elephant

First Lady Imelda Marcos : Dame Grand Cross (First Class) of the Order of Chula Chom Klao

First Lady Lee Soon-ja : Dame Grand Cross (First Class) of the Order of Chula Chom Klao

See also 
 Mirror page : List of honours of the Thai Royal Family by country

References 

Honours of Thailand awarded to heads of state and royalty
Thailand